James Richard Thornton (11 January 1861 – 1 March 1916) was an English cricketer. Thornton was a right-handed batsman who bowled right-arm fast. He was born at Horsham, Sussex.

Thornton made three first-class appearances for Sussex. He made his debut against the touring Australians in 1880 at the County Cricket Ground, Hove, while the following season he made a second appearance against Hampshire at the same ground. His third appearance came in 1883 against the Marylebone Cricket Club at Lord's. In his three matches, he scored 73 runs at an average of 14.60, with a high score of 29. With the ball, he took a single wicket, that of Hampshire's Russell Bencraft.

He died at Burgess Hill, Sussex, on 1 March 1916.

References

External links
James Thornton at ESPNcricinfo
James Thornton at CricketArchive

1861 births
1916 deaths
People from Horsham
English cricketers
Sussex cricketers